Kirindiwela is a town in the Western Province of Sri Lanka. It is the main administrative centre for the "Dompe" electorate in Gampaha district. The postal code of Kirindiwela is 11730. Kirindiwela is connected Colombo Avissawella road and Colombo Kandy road. It is also connected New Kandy road from Weliweriya towards Kaduwela.

Government Institutions 

Assistant Government Agent's office Local administrative center of the central government (Dompe Divisional Secretariat) https://web.archive.org/web/20100716183722/http://www.ds.gov.lk/ds/dompe/
Village council statard in 1949Dompe Pradeshiya Sabhawa Local government officeKirindiwela Police StationTransportation
The Kirindiwela bus depot provides a local public transport centre and the garage run by the Sri Lanka Transport Board.

EducationKirindiwela Madya Maha Vidyalaya: Central CollegeKirindiwela Maha Vidyalaya: High SchoolKirindiwela Sangamittha Balika   Vidyalaya:

 Notable institutions 
Notable institutions close to Kirindiwela town includes:
 Meethirigala Nissarana Vanaya: Arguably the most renowned meditation centre in Sri Lanka. Monks live in Kutis (living quarters) in dense low-country jungle on a hill. There are English speaking meditation teachers with student monks from all over the world. (Alternative spelling 'Mithirigala')
 Vedagama''': ('Village of Healing’) Only village in Sri Lanka completely populated by indigenous medical practitioners. Established as a part of former PresidentRanasinghe Premadasa’s “Gam Udawa ” (Village Awakening) program.

Notable people
Notable people related to Kirindiwela area:

Mahagama Sekara 
K. Jayatillake
Shrimathi Senarathne

See also
 List of towns in Sri Lanka

References

External links
Map of the western province
Information about Meditation Centres, Forest Monasteries, and other important places in Sri Lanka for Western bhikkhus and serious lay practitioners
Meditation centers
City of Yakkala
Dompe Divisional Secretariat
Government Institutions in Dompe Divisional Secretariat

Populated places in Gampaha District